Riccardo Piscitelli (born 10 October 1993) is an Italian footballer who plays as a goalkeeper for Hungarian club Mezőkövesd.

Club career
After leaving Benevento, agent Alessio Sundas remarked that Piscitelli is a goalkeeper who had shown huge experience contributing to the rise of Benevento. While Piscitelli was on trial at Vis Pesaro where he played for the team in friendly matches, Sundas engaged foreign teams for his transfer.

On 5 December 2018, he signed a contract until the end of the 2018–19 season with Serie B club Carpi.

On 28 June 2019, Piscitelli joined Romanian club Dinamo București. He left Dinamo after only one season and signed a contract with Portuguese club C.D. Nacional.

On 21 July 2021, he signed with Mezőkövesd in Hungary.

International career 
Piscitelli played for the Italy U-20 three times, in September 2012 against Turkey, March 2013 against Poland and June 2013 also against Poland.

Footnotes

References

External links 
 
 AIC profile (data by football.it) 

1993 births
Living people
People from Vimercate
Footballers from Lombardy
Italian footballers
Association football goalkeepers
Italy youth international footballers
A.C. Milan players
Carrarese Calcio players
Benevento Calcio players
A.C. Carpi players
FC Dinamo București players
C.D. Nacional players
Mezőkövesdi SE footballers
Serie B players
Serie C players
Liga I players
Primeira Liga players
Nemzeti Bajnokság I players
Italian expatriate footballers
Expatriate footballers in Romania
Expatriate footballers in Portugal
Expatriate footballers in Hungary
Italian expatriate sportspeople in Romania
Italian expatriate sportspeople in Portugal
Italian expatriate sportspeople in Hungary
Sportspeople from the Province of Monza e Brianza